A Town Called Malice is a 2023 British crime thriller television series created by Nick Love for Sky Max. The series premiered on Sky Max on Thursday 16 March, and the full box set is available to watch on NOW.

Synopsis
Set in the 1980s, the Lord family is past their criminal heydays, but that does not mean they do not feel nostalgic for it. Gene, the youngest of the family, feels overlooked and neglected by his family who fail to recognise his intelligence and killer instincts. After narrowly surviving a gangland battle, Gene and his fiancée Cindy flee to the Costa del Sol, Spain to evade arrest and find themselves embroiled in the local underworld, desperately trying to avoid trouble. Things heat up even further when the rest of the Lords join them on the Costa del Sol and try to reclaim their halcyon day as criminal top dogs.

Cast

Main
 Jack Rowan as Gene Lord 
 Tahirah Sharif as Cindy Carter
 Jason Flemyng as Albert Lord
 Martha Plimpton as Mint Ma Lord
 Lex Shrapnel as Leonard Lord
 Daniel Sharman as Kelly Lord
 George Jaques as Anthony Lord
 Eliza Butterworth as Carly Lord

Recurring
 Leanne Best as Detective Inspector Lindsay

Guest
 Dougray Scott as Uncle Tony

Episodes

Production
In February 2021, it was announced Nick Love was developing A Town Called Malice with Vertigo Films for Sky. Sky had officially ordered the eight-part series as of the Edinburgh Television Festival in August 2021, with Rogue State having boarded the project.

The cast was announced in January 2022, including Jason Flemyng, Jack Rowan, Tahirah Sharif, Martha Plimpton, Dougray Scott, Lex Shrapnel, Daniel Sharman, George Jaques, and Eliza Butterworth.

Principal photography began in London in November 2021 before moving to Tenerife at the end of January 2022. Production on the first season wrapped in June 2022 in Tenerife.

Release
NBCUniversal Global Distribution will handle international distribution.

Reception
Nick Hilton from The Independent gave the first episode three out of five stars, remarking, 'It is admirably unrestrained in a genre where restraint has been all the rage. It’s just a shame, then, that its vivacious styling couldn’t be matched by a smarter script.' Lucy Mangan of The Guardian awarded the first episode three stars out of five, declaring, 'In short, for those who like this sort of thing, this is the sort of thing they like. The rest of us may just need to keep taking the Sanatogen and wait for someone to wheel us into the shade for a nap.'

References

External links
 

2023 British television series debuts
Crime thriller television series
Sky UK original programming
Television series set in the 1980s
Television shows set in Spain
English-language television shows